Rhue may refer to:
 Rhue, Scotland, a small settlement north of Ullapool.
 Morton Rhue, a pen name used by Todd Strasser.
 Madlyn Rhue, an American character actress.
 Rhue (river), a tributary of the Dordogne, central France.